Malachy is a given name of Irish origin. 

Notable bearers of the name include:

 Saint Malachy (1095-1148), Archbishop of Armagh and first native-born Irish saint
 Máel Sechnaill mac Máele Ruanaid, 9th-century High King of Ireland, also known as Malachy I
 Máel Sechnaill mac Domnaill, High King of Ireland in the late 10th and early 11th centuries, also known as Malachy II
 Malachy McCourt (born 1931), Irish-American actor, writer and politician
 Malachy O'Rourke, Irish Gaelic footballer and manager
 Malachy Fisher, fictional character from the British soap opera Hollyoaks
 Palacegarden Malachy, winner of the 2012 Westminster Kennel Club Dog Show
 Malachy Bernard Loye, English Cricket Player

See also
 Malachi (given name)

Masculine given names